Amédée Dominique Dieudonné (6 August 1890 – 1 February 1960) was a French luthier. His instruments sold in Europe and the United States.

Biography 
The son of the luthier Albert Dieudonné, Amédée Dominique Dieudonné was born on 6 August 1890 in Mirecourt in the Vosges department. Amédée Dominique Dieudonné was formed by Gustave Bazin and then at the Darche workshop in Brussels. After the First World War, he established himself as a luthier in Mirecourt in the 1920s. Specializing in the copies of the Cremona masters, he excelled in the rendering of varnishes, going from red to bright red.

Amédée Dominique Dieudonné died on 1 February 1960, in Mirecourt.

Among his numerous pupils were Charles René Bazin, Jacques then Alfred-Eugène Holder, Pierre Vogelweith, Rambert Würlizer, Victor Aubry, Philippe Coornaert, William Mönig, Jean Striebig, Étienne Vatelot.

Sources 
 René Vannes : Essai d’un dictionnaire universel des luthiers,  Librairie Fischbacher, Paris, 1932, 430 pages

References

External links 
 Violin by Amédée Dominique Dieudonné on Cité de la Musique
 Dictionnaire des facteurs d'instruments de musique en Wallonie
 Dieudonné, Amédée Dominique on Archives de la lutherie Mirecourt

Luthiers from Mirecourt
1890 births
1960 deaths